Anna Volodymyrivna Sedokova (born 16 December 1982) is a Ukrainian singer, actress and television presenter. Sedokova came to prominence in 2002 as a member of pop girl group Nu Virgos, known in the CIS countries as VIA Gra and in which she was nicknamed Anya. Following two years in the "golden line-up" of the group, she pursued a solo music career in 2006. The singer released a string of singles until her debut album, Lichnoe, was released in 2016 to commercial success, peaking at number two in Russia.

Simultaneously to her music career, Sedokova achieved popular recognition as an actress and television presenter in Ukrainian and Russian productions. She now lives in Los Angeles, United States with her three children.

Early life
Anna Sedokova's parents moved from Tomsk, Russian SFSR, and divorced when she was young. She was born in Kiev (now Kyiv, Ukraine). She developed a childhood interest in music and dance, and she entered Kyiv National University of Culture and Arts when she was 17, and continued her studies, while also hosting television shows.

Career

Her first TV project was work as a news anchor for the music TV channel, OTV. By the age of 18 she had worked in three TV programs: NEWS BLOK, Fashionable Life, and The Big Sunday News Digest. In 2001 she passed an audition for the morning show Podjem (“Waking up”), which had the highest ratings in the country, on Novyi Kanal (New Channel). Between 2002 and 2004 she was a member of the Nu Virgos pop group.

She appeared in a movie titled Cinderella and another based on a Gogol's book, which was called The Evenings on the Homestead. Her 2006 role in The Tunguska Meteorite was a turning-point and in 2008 she acted in The Power of Attraction.

Sedokova also started a solo-singer career. Her first video for the song "My Heart" reached the top of the charts and gained her an Audience Appreciation Award at the 5 STARS Sotchi Music Festival. Afterwards, she did a video for her song "The Very Best Girl" and "I Am Getting Used". Both videos were huge hits in Russia and Ukraine. But TV wouldn't let Sedokova go. TVStar Superstar, the most expensive show in the country's history, aired on Ukraine in 2008. Every Sunday Sedokova was in the live broadcast of a 3-hour show with 400 participants.

In 2009, Sedokova was named the best TV Host of the country by Elle. Sedokova's TV career developed - she became one of the faces of Channel One, the biggest Russian-speaking channel in the world. She also became a host of the show King of the Ring. Sedokova hosted The New Songs About the Most Essential Thing - a big live concert in which the best 50 performers of the country participated. She also took part at Two Stars and Stars on Ice shows and entertained the public with a well received creative performance. These projects attracted tens of millions of viewers and became the highest rated shows on Russian TV.

In 2011, Sedokova was the host of Project Runway Russia. Also in 2011, The Pregnant, with Sedokova as lead actress, was a great success. Sedokova's first book The Art of Seduction is still a best-seller in Russia. The theme of this book should be of no surprise to her audience – for several years in a row Sedokova remains the recipient of "Sexiest Female Award" as well as "Most beloved star" award (given to a star popular with all generations and both genders). She was also named "The Most Desirable Female Performer" in Russia.

In 2014, the singer was criticised in Ukraine for having accepted awards in Russia while many Ukrainians believed their country was a victim of Russian aggression.

Personal life
Sedokova married Belarusian footballer Valyantsin Byalkevich in 2004. A few months after their marriage, their daughter Alina was born on 8 December. The couple divorced in 2006, because of his cheating. Sedokova was married to businessman Maxim Chernyavsky from February 2011 to February 2013; the two had one daughter, Monika. In May 2017, reports emerged that Sedokova would marry Artyom Komarov, a Russian businessman and the father of her third child, a son Hector. In August 2017, Sedokova announced that she had ended her relationship with Komarov. In September 2020, she married for the third time, to Latvian professional basketball player Jānis Timma.

In December 2010, Sedokova came out as bisexual during an online conference with the readers of the Ukrainian portal tochka.net. She later confirmed it in an interview with Novyi Kanal, describing her sexual experiences with her female lovers as "wonderful".

In 2013, Sedokova criticised the so-called "gay propaganda" law adopted by the State Duma of the Russian Federation. In an interview with the radio station Echo of Moscow, the singer expressed bewilderment at the vague wording of the law, asking the question "what is propaganda?" Sedokova stated that the authors and supporters of the law "have no right to tell someone else whom to love and what to do".

Discography

Studio albums

Singles

As lead artist

As a featured artist

Music videos

Movies
Cinderella, 2003
The Evenings On the Homestead, 2004
Tunguska Meteorite, 2007
The Power of Attraction, 2008
The Pregnant, 2011 (Box Office Record in Russia in 2011)

Publications
Iskusstvo soblazneniya, AST (2010)

Notes

References

External links 

 
 
Anna Sedokova on Spotify

1982 births
Living people
Musicians from Kyiv
21st-century Ukrainian women singers
Ukrainian pop singers
Ukrainian people of Russian descent
Nu Virgos members
Ukrainian bisexual people
Bisexual women
21st-century Ukrainian actresses
Television presenters from Kyiv
Russian-language singers
Association footballers' wives and girlfriends
Ukrainian LGBT rights activists
Ukrainian women television presenters
Actors from Kyiv
Ukrainian emigrants to the United States
LGBT singers